Siphunculina is a genus of small flies known as tropical eye flies. They are known for their habit of visiting the eyes of humans and other vertebrates to feed on fluids and in doing so cause annoyance, spread bacterial or viral diseases or cause injury to the eye. They have a habit of resting in large numbers on suspended strings, ropes and cobwebs.

Several species are known from the Old World, including Asia, Europe and Africa.

Species 
Some of the species include:
Siphunculina aenea Macquart, 1835
Siphunculina aureopilosa Séguy, 1938
Siphunculina aureosetosa Nartshuk, 1992
Siphunculina breviseta Malloch, 1924
Siphunculina corbetti Duda, 1936
Siphunculina fasciata Cherian, 1971
Siphunculina freyi Sabrosky, 1957
Siphunculina funicola Meijere, 1905
Siphunculina intonsa Lamb, 1918
Siphunculina lobeliaphila Sabrosky, 1951
Siphunculina loici Nartshuk, 2001
Siphunculina lurida Enderlein, 1911
Siphunculina manipurensis Cherian, 1977
Siphunculina matilei Nartshuk, 2001
Siphunculina mediana Becker, 1912
Siphunculina minima Meijere, 1908
Siphunculina montana Spencer, 1977
Siphunculina nidicola Nartshuk, 1971
Siphunculina nitidissima Kanmiya, 1982
Siphunculina ornatifrons Loew, 1858
Siphunculina peraspera Séguy, 1957
Siphunculina punctifrons Sabrosky, 1954
Siphunculina quinquangula Loew, 1873
Siphunculina sharmai Cherian, 1977
Siphunculina stackelbergi Duda, 1933
Siphunculina stigmatica Kanmiya, 1994
Siphunculina striolatus Wiedemann, 1830
Siphunculina ulceria Cherian, 1971

References

External links 
 Encyclopedia of Life

Oscinellinae
Chloropidae genera